Hans J. Appenzeller (14 March 1899 – ?) was a Swiss rower.

Appenzeller was born in 1899. He was a member of the See-Club Zürich, a rowing club in Zürich. He competed at the 1936 Summer Olympics in Berlin with the men's coxed pair where they came fifth.

References

1899 births
Year of death missing
Swiss male rowers
Olympic rowers of Switzerland
Rowers at the 1936 Summer Olympics
Rowers from Zürich
European Rowing Championships medalists
20th-century Swiss people